Agropatria is Venezuela's largest agricultural supply company, supplying fertilizer, seeds and agrochemicals, as well as loans to agricultural producers. It is a State-owned corporation which was incorporated in October 2010 to take over the activities of Agroisleña.

Agroisleña' was established in 1958 by Spanish immigrants, and grew to become the country’s leading agricultural supply company. It was accused by President Hugo Chavez of abusing its dominant market position. With the nationalization of Agropatria, the state has about 51% of Venezuela's food storage capacity. However, by May 2015, the Confederation of Agricultural Producers (Fedeagro) reported that Agropatria has a monopoly position in the market of agricultural supplements, having approximately 95% of market share, more than double of Agroisleña at the moment of the nationalization. Also Agropatria has privileges when it comes to access foreign exchange for the importation of agricultural materials, in detriment of private enterprises.

References

External links
 Official website 

Stock and station agencies
Government-owned companies of Venezuela
Agriculture companies established in 1958
Business services companies established in 1958
1958 establishments in Venezuela
Venezuelan brands